Atomic Heart may refer to:

 Atomic Heart (album), by Mr. Children
 Atomic Heart (video game), an action role-playing video game